Roger E. Young (born May 13, 1942 in Champaign, Illinois) is an American TV and film director.

Career
Young graduated with a Bachelor of Science degree in journalism from the University of Illinois.  He worked as a producer-director at Channel 6, the NBC affiliate in Indianapolis, Indiana.  He then moved to Chicago and became a producer for Foote-Cone & Belding Advertising, where he produced national commercials.  Later he moved to directing commercials for the production company of Lippert-Saviano, and then for Topel & Associates, before opening his own production company, Young & Company, producing and directing commercials.  In 1977 he moved to Los Angeles and was hired as associate producer on a television film entitled Something for Joey.  This led to being offered associate producer of Lou Grant.  Gene Reynolds, executive producer of the show, became Young's mentor, and in the second season Young was given the opportunity to direct an episode.  He won an Emmy and two Director's Guild Awards for directing episodes of the series.  He then directed the two-hour pilot of Magnum, P.I.. Young directed several other pilots, all but one of which was turned into a series.  Young then began to concentrate on films and mini-series.  Young has written five teleplays that have been produced. His episodic work include Rome, The Closer and Law & Order: LA.

Filmography

Awards and nominations

Directors Guild of America Award: "Lou Grant"
Directors Guild of America Award: "Lou Grant"
Emmy Award: Directorial Achievement, "Lou Grant"
Emmy nomination: Directorial Achievement, "Bitter Harvest"
Humanitas Award: "Bitter Harvest"
Humanitas Award: "Two of a Kind"
ACE Award nomination: Directorial Achievement, "Gulag"
ACE Award nomination: Best Picture, "Gulag"
Emmy nomination: Best Mini-Series, "Bourne Identity"
Golden Globe nomination: Best Mini-Series, "Bourne Identity"
Emmy nomination: Best Film, "Murder in Mississippi"
Directors Guild of America Award: Directorial Achievement, "Murder in Mississippi"
ACE Award: Best Motion Picture, "DoubleCrossed"
Golden Globe nomination: Best Picture, "Jewels"
Emmy Award: Best Mini-Series, "Joseph"
Emmy nomination: Best Mini-Series, "Moses"
Emmy nomination: Best Mini-Series, "Jesus"

External links
 
 

1942 births
Living people
American film directors
American television directors
Directors Guild of America Award winners
University of Illinois alumni